Live from the Atlantic Studios is a live album by AC/DC released on the Bonfire box set. The album was recorded live at the Atlantic Recording Studios in New York, on 7 December 1977 and all tracks were remixed by George Young.  This was an official Radio Station/Promo release by Atlantic Records. It was initially released on LP in 1978, and later on CD (1986). AC/DC's performance was the first in a series of promotional concert-events for Atlantic Records acts.  Catalog # LAAS 001. The CD version was officially released to fans in 1997 as part of the Bonfire collection. Prior to that, this album was widely bootlegged among AC/DC fans.

This album is one of two live albums on Bonfire, the other being Let There Be Rock: The Movie – Live in Paris. Both albums are two of three live albums contained within an AC/DC rarity box set, the other being Live Rarities on Backtracks.

Track listing
All songs composed by Malcolm Young, Angus Young and Bon Scott.

Side one
 "Live Wire" – 6:20
 "Problem Child" – 4:44
 "High Voltage" – 6:01
 "Hell Ain't a Bad Place to Be" – 4:18
 "Dog Eat Dog" – 4:46

Side two
 "The Jack" – 8:41
 "Whole Lotta Rosie" – 5:15
 "Rocker" – 5:33

Personnel
 Bon Scott – lead vocals
 Angus Young – lead guitar
 Malcolm Young – rhythm guitar, backing vocals
 Cliff Williams – bass guitar, backing vocals
 Phil Rudd – drums
 Jimmy Douglas – recording engineer
 Tom Heid – assistant engineer

Notes

On the CD version of the album, it is stated in the booklet that the beginning of "Live Wire" and the end of "Rocker" were erased from the master tape sometime before 1997 and had to be replaced with short segments from the vinyl record. This task proved difficult because the album was only offered to radio stations in the United States. A slight edit can be heard in both songs where the vinyl source switches to the remastered tapes.

References

1997 live albums
AC/DC live albums
East West Records live albums